Nemapogon scholzi is a moth of the family Tineidae. It found in Greece and on Crete.

References

Moths described in 2000
Nemapogoninae